Yvon Goujon (born 21 January 1937) is a French former professional football and coach.

External links

External links
 Profile on French federation official site
 

1937 births
Living people
Sportspeople from Lorient
Association football midfielders
French footballers
France international footballers
Ligue 1 players
AS Saint-Étienne players
FC Sochaux-Montbéliard players
Limoges FC players
Stade Rennais F.C. players
FC Rouen players
Angoulême Charente FC players
French football managers
French expatriate football managers
French expatriate sportspeople in the Republic of the Congo
Angoulême Charente FC managers
Limoges FC managers
Expatriate football managers in the Republic of the Congo
Congo national football team managers
Footballers from Brittany